The Agusan del Norte Provincial Board is the Sangguniang Panlalawigan (provincial legislature) of the Philippine province of Agusan del Norte.

The members are elected via plurality-at-large voting: the province is divided into two districts, one sending one member and the other sending seven members to the provincial board; the electorate votes the number of seats allocated for their district, with the candidates with the highest number of votes (first in the first district and the first seven in the second) being elected. The vice governor is the ex officio presiding officer, and only votes to break ties. The vice governor is elected via the plurality voting system throughout the province.

District apportionment

Redistricting changes
Identical to the Legislative districts of Agusan del Norte, only that the highly urbanized city of Butuan is excluded for the purposes of provincial board representation.
1st District: Las Nieves
2nd District: Buenavista, Cabadbaran, Carmen, Jabonga, Kitcharao, Las Nieves, Magallanes, Nasipit, Remedios T. Romualdez, Santiago, Tubay

List of members

Current members 
These are the members after the 2022 local elections and 2018 barangay and SK elections:

 Vice Governor: Rico Corvera (PDP–Laban)

Vice Governor

1st District

2nd District

References

Provincial boards in the Philippines
Politics of Agusan del Norte